Twin Lakes State Park is a state park in Virginia. It is located in Central Virginia in Prince Edward County.

Twin Lakes State Park, centrally located in Virginia's Piedmont region, provides visitors from all over the Commonwealth with a variety of lakefront activities in a secluded setting. Swimming, camping, fishing, biking, canoeing and hiking are popular activities. The park is home to Cedar Crest Conference Center, a perfect facility for group meetings, family reunions, birthday parties, wedding receptions and company picnics.

The land for Twin Lakes State Park was initially bought from struggling farmers by the federal government during the Great Depression. Two parks, Goodwin Lake and Prince Edward Lake, were founded in 1939 and until the early 1960s were run as two racially segregated parks.

In 1948, businessman Maceo Conrad Martin and his family embarked on a vacation to Staunton River State Park. As expected, Park authorities denied the Martins entry to the state park based on their race. The Martins consulted the Richmond, Virginia-based civil rights law firm of Hill, Tucker and Robinson, led by Oliver Hill. Hill's firm filed a civil suit against the Commonwealth of Virginia under the “separate but equal” doctrine. The suit alleged that Staunton River State Park's policy only allowed white citizens to use its facility, with no accommodations for African Americans. The Virginia Department of Conservation and Development first responded by converting a segregated African-American/"Colored Only" recreation area into a state park facility: the "Prince Edward State Park for Negroes" (now the Twin Lakes State Park). In 1949, Virginia Governor William Tuck allotted $195,000 to create 6 housekeeping cabins, an expanded swimming area, expanded parking, a bathhouse, and concession stand.

Opened to the general "Colored Only/African-Americans Only" public in June 1950, Prince Edward State Park for Negroes became Virginia's eighth state park and the only pre-Civil Rights Era state park for African-Americans. African Americans from across the mid-Atlantic states visited the park for its swimming, recreation, camping and dancing. 

The parks merged in 1976 and became Twin Lakes State Park in 1986.

In 1995, Virginia erected a marker to acknowledge his lawsuit's contribution to desegregating the park. The marker reads:

See also
 List of Virginia state parks
 List of Virginia state forests

References

External links
Twin Lakes

Parks on the National Register of Historic Places in Virginia
State parks of Virginia
Parks in Prince Edward County, Virginia
Civilian Conservation Corps in Virginia
National Register of Historic Places in Prince Edward County, Virginia
African-American history of Virginia